Silphium (also known as silphion, laserwort, or laser) is an unidentified plant that was used in classical antiquity as a seasoning, perfume, aphrodisiac, and medicine. It also was used as a contraceptive by ancient Greeks and Romans. It was the essential item of trade from the ancient North African city of Cyrene, and was so critical to the Cyrenian economy that most of their coins bore a picture of the plant. The valuable product was the plant's resin (laser, laserpicium, or lasarpicium).

Silphium was an important species in classical antiquity, as evidenced by the Egyptians and Knossos Minoans developing a specific glyph to represent the silphium plant. It was used widely by most ancient Mediterranean cultures; the Romans, who mentioned the plant in poems or songs, considered it "worth its weight in denarii" (silver coins), or even gold.  Legend said that it was a gift from the god Apollo.

The exact identity of silphium is unclear. It was claimed to have become extinct in Roman times. It is commonly believed to be a fennel relative in the genus Ferula, perhaps a variety of giant fennel. The extant plants Margotia gummifera, Ferula tingitana, and Ferula drudeana have been suggested as other possibilities. Another theory is that it was simply a high quality variety of asafetida, a common spice in the Roman Empire. The two spices were considered the same by many Romans including the geographer Strabo. In 2021, a study from Istanbul University identified Ferula drudeana as a likely candidate for Silphium, matching both the appearance of Silphium in descriptions and the spice-like gum-resin of Silphium, though without a surviving sample no genetic analysis can be made.

Identity and extinction

The identity of silphium is highly debated. It is generally considered to belong to the genus Ferula, as an extinct or living species. The currently extant plants , Ferula tingitana, Ferula narthex, Ferula drudeana, and Thapsia garganica have been suggested as possible identities. Theophrastus mentioned silphium as having thick roots covered in black bark, about 48 centimeters long, or one cubit, with a hollow stalk, similar to fennel, and golden leaves, like celery.

The cause of silphium's supposed extinction is not entirely known but numerous factors are suggested. Overgrazing combined with overharvesting have long been cited as the primary factors that led to its extinction. However, recent research has challenged this notion, arguing instead that desertification in ancient Cyrenaica was the primary driver of silphium's decline.

Another theory is that when Roman provincial governors took over power from Greek colonists, they over-farmed silphium and rendered the soil unable to yield the type that was said to be of such medicinal value. Theophrastus wrote in Enquiry into Plants that the type of Ferula specifically referred to as "silphium" was odd in that it could not be cultivated. He reports inconsistencies in the information he received about this, however. This could suggest the plant is similarly sensitive to soil chemistry as huckleberries which, when grown from seed, are devoid of fruit.

Similar to the soil theory, another theory holds that the plant was a hybrid, which often results in very desired traits in the first generation, but second-generation can yield very unpredictable outcomes. This could have resulted in plants without fruits, when planted from seeds, instead of asexually reproducing through their roots.

Pliny reported that the last known stalk of silphium found in Cyrenaica was given to Emperor Nero "as a curiosity".

A 2021 paper made the case that Ferula drudeana, an endemic species found in Turkey, is the true identity of Silphium based on similarity of appearance and production of a resin with supposedly similar properties to Silphium. However, this hypothesis has not, gained traction. One problem with this hypothesis is that F. drudeana appears to be much more closely related to other Anatolian species than to North African Ferula species, which would not be consistent with the origin of Silphium in North Africa.

Ancient medicine
Many medical uses were ascribed to the plant. It was said that it could be used to treat cough, sore throat, fever, indigestion, aches and pains, warts, and all kinds of maladies.
Hippocrates wrote:
When the gut protrudes and will not remain in its place, scrape the finest and most compact silphium into small pieces and apply as a cataplasm.

The plant may also have functioned as a contraceptive and abortifacient. Many species in the parsley family have estrogenic properties, and some, such as wild carrot, are known to act as abortifacients.

Culinary uses

Silphium was used in Graeco-Roman cooking, notably in recipes by Apicius.

Long after its extinction, silphium continued to be mentioned in lists of aromatics copied one from another, until it makes perhaps its last appearance in the list of spices that the Carolingian cook should have at hand— ("A short list of condiments that should be in the home")—by a certain "Vinidarius", whose excerpts of Apicius survive in one 8th-century uncial manuscript. Vinidarius's dates may not be much earlier.

Connection with the heart symbol

There has been some speculation about the connection between silphium and the traditional heart shape (♥). Silver coins from Cyrene of the 6th–5th centuries BCE bear a similar design, sometimes accompanied by a silphium plant, and is understood to represent its seed or fruit. Some plants in the family Apiaceae, such as Heracleum sphondylium, have heart-shaped indehiscent mericarps (a type of fruit).

Contemporary writings help tie silphium to sexuality and love.  Silphium appears in Pausanias' Description of Greece in a story of the Dioscuri staying at a house belonging to Phormion, a Spartan, "For it so happened that his maiden daughter was living in it. By the next day this maiden and all her girlish apparel had disappeared, and in the room were found images of the Dioscuri, a table, and silphium upon it."
Silphium as laserpicium makes an appearance in a poem (Catullus 7) of Catullus to his lover Lesbia (though others have suggested that the reference here is instead to silphium's use as a treatment for mental illness, tying it to the "madness" of love).

Heraldry
In the Italian military heraldry,  ("Silphium of Cyrenaica, smoothly cut and printed in gold; in blazon: silphium couped or of Cyrenaica") is the symbol granted to units that distinguished themselves in the Western Desert Campaign in North Africa during World War II.

See also
 Necropolis of Cyrene

Notes

References

Footnotes

Bibliography
 
 Herodotus. The Histories. II:161, 181, III:131, IV:150–65, 200–05.
 Pausanias. Description of Greece 3.16.1–3
 Pliny the Elder. Natural History. XIX:15 and XXII:100–06.
 
 Theophrastus. Enquiry into plants and minor works on odours and weather signs, with an English translation by Sir Arthur Hort, bart (1916). Volume 1 (Books I–V) and Volume 2 (Books VI–IX) Volume 2 includes the index, which lists silphium (Greek ) on page 476, column 2, 2nd entry.

Further reading
 
 
 
 
 
 
 
 
 
 
William Turner, A New Herball (1551, 1562, 1568)

External links

 Contraception In Ancient Times: Use of Morning-After Pill by David W. Tschanz
 Silphion at Gernot Katzer's Spice Pages
 The Secret of the Heart
 Margotia gummifera
 Ferula tingitana

Abortifacients
Spices
Extinct plants
Holocene extinctions
Medicinal plants
National symbols of Libya
Roman cuisine
Ancient Greek cuisine
Edible Apiaceae